The 2014–15 Sunfoil Series was a first-class cricket competition held in South Africa from 25 September 2014 to 29 March 2015. Lions won the tournament for the first time after completing a 188 run victory in the final over against Dolphins cricket team in the penultimate round of the competition.

Squads
As of 11 September 2014

Points table

Statistics

Most runs

Most wickets

References

External links
 Series home at ESPN Cricinfo

South African domestic cricket competitions
Sunfoil Series
2014–15 South African cricket season
Sunfoil Series